Eduardo Cano (17 April 1928 – 5 January 1975) was an Argentine equestrian. He competed in two events at the 1956 Summer Olympics.

References

External links
 

1928 births
1975 deaths
Argentine male equestrians
Equestrians at the 1956 Summer Olympics
Olympic equestrians of Argentina
Place of birth missing
Victims of aviation accidents or incidents in Argentina
Victims of aviation accidents or incidents in 1975